Rimoldi is an Italian surname. Notable people with the surname include:

Adriano Rimoldi (1912–1965), Italian actor
Jorgelina Rimoldi (born 1971), Argentine field hockey player
Lucas Rimoldi (born 1980), Argentine footballer
Pietro Rimoldi, Italian cyclist

Italian-language surnames